The 1948 Tennessee gubernatorial election was held on November 2, 1948. Democratic nominee Gordon Browning defeated Republican nominee Roy Acuff with 66.91% of the vote.

Primary elections
Primary elections were held on August 4, 1948.

Democratic primary

Candidates
Gordon Browning, former Governor
Jim Nance McCord, incumbent Governor
James N. Hardin
Jay Hanson

Results

General election

Candidates
Gordon Browning, Democratic
Roy Acuff, Republican

Results

References

1948
Tennessee
Gubernatorial